In applied mathematics, Tikhonov's theorem on dynamical systems is a result on stability of solutions of systems of differential equations.  It has applications to chemical kinetics.  The theorem is named after Andrey Nikolayevich Tikhonov.

Statement 

Consider this system of differential equations:

 

 

where the second equation is the solution of the algebraic equation

 

Note that there may be more than one such function .

Tikhonov's theorem states that as  the solution of the system of two differential equations above approaches the solution of the degenerate system if  is a stable root of the "adjoined system"

References 

Differential equations
Perturbation theory
Theorems in dynamical systems